Noa James (Born Jamie Wilson) is a West Coast rapper based in the Inland Empire region of California.

Early life 
Noa experienced more struggles than most people experience in their entire lives at a very young age ranging from his mother's incarceration after abandoning him, living in an orphanage, the deportation of his father, to the most prolific moment in his life; the passing of his grandfather.

Music career 

Rapping since the age of 13, Noa James began his musical journey as a successful battle rapper who quickly became known for his brutal punch lines and sharp tongue. After 5 years in the battle circuit, Noa realized that he wanted success as an artist and although he was young he knew he had a big story to tell.

Over the years James' autobiographical rhymes have made him a pioneer in the art of storytelling and although his powerful stage presence and large stature has made him a force to be reckoned with, it is the size of his heart, that has remained most imminent. Not only making a name for himself as an artist, Noa is also widely known as a leading force in Southern California's Inland Empire underground hip hop movement.

Under Black Cloud Music, Noa, along with five other likeminded and passionate artists have been breaking the mold and starting a musical movement that is undeniable and worthy of its growing success. After the release of several independent mixtapes before his Black Cloud affiliation in May 2010, Noa released his first official album on the label entitled Beautiful Darkness, which was well received and respectably noted by both his fans and peers. It was a project of love and labor and showed both sides of James' personality and elaborate mind. Beautiful Darkness is now available in several record stores throughout Los Angeles, the Inland Empire, and Las Vegas.

In May 2011, James released Intelligent, Elegant, Elephant: Humble Power, a project that generated quite a larger buzz digitally following his anticipated debut performance at a major hip hop music festival, Paid Dues in San Bernardino, California. During this time, James also was featured on the front cover of IE Weekly, a weekly magazine sister to LA Weekly, followed by his feature on XXL Magazine's The Break,

In the Summer of 2011, James, along with a roster of indie artists throughout the Inland Empire, embarked on the Humble Power Tour where they toured and performed throughout Southern California. This was James first tour & a tour he booked on his own.

Continuing with that momentum, James performed at Culture Magazine 420 Event in 2011 & 2012, House of Blues Sunset for the Paid Dues Pre-Party 2012, toured across the entire United States with Murs, Prof & Fashawn in 2013 for 2 months & 50+ shows, independently booked his second tour it's The Common Ground Tour 2014, performed at the Sunset Strip Music Festival in 2014, performed at the legendary Low End Theory 2014-2017, RhymeFest at the Fox Theater Pomona 2014, Broke LA formerly Brokechella 2015, second national tour with Murs for Have a Nice Life Tour 2015, Tucson Hip Hop Festival 2017, SXSW official showcase with The Cool Kids 2017, independently booked his third tour, Pacific Breeze Tour with Vel The Wonder & more!

James has opened up for Action Bronson, Jurassic 5, Freddie Gibbs, Planet Asia, Murs, Dipset, Fashawn, Curren$y, Dom Kennedy, Raekwon, Pharohe Monch, Del the Funky Homosapien, 2 Chainz, Dipset, Chino XL, Black Milk, YG, Pac Div,  Blu, G Perico, Eureka the Butcher, Skeme, Kurupt, Bambu, RJ, Mann, DJ Icy Ice, Bad Lucc, Gangsta Boo, Kxng Crooked, The Cool Kids, Lil Debbie, Denzel Curry, Dizzy Wright, King Lil G, DMX, Audio Push & more (2011-current)

In California James has performed at The Roxy, The Novo, NOS Center, The Union, The Observatory, Fox Theater Pomona, The Glass House, HOB Sunset & Anaheim, Belasco Theater, Slim’s, The Catalyst, The Velvet Room, Fulton 55, SLO Brew & more (2011-current)

James has left his mark on the stages in these state: Arizona, California, Colorado, Florida, Georgia, Idaho, Illinois, Indiana, Kansas, Massachusetts, Minnesota, Missouri, Nebraska, Nevada, New Mexico, New York, Ohio, Oklahoma, Oregon, Texas, Utah, Vermont, Washington, Wisconsin & Wyoming

Philanthropy 
James also holds various charity events every year to support programs and shelters in the surrounding communities, including his annual "Toys for Tots" event to support Veronica's House of Mercy, a nonprofit organization, as well as food drives to give hope to those in need.

Discography 
In Blanka Mode EP (2009)
Sounds of a Monster LP (2009)
Beautiful Darkness Album (2010)
James For the Win Vol. 1 (2011)
Intelligent, Elegant, Elephant: Humble Power EP (2011)
The Adventures Of Young Orca EP (2013)
Fat Boy Love Letter Ep (2013)
Pterodactyl Jones Album (2014)
Leaders.In.Training/Love Is Truth EP (2015)
3 Bullets In A Golden EP (2016)
Peace Of Cake EP (2017)
GnarlyOrca EP (2017)
Cherry Yellow Glow EP (2018)
Phone Rang EP (2018)
Granny Said Album (2018)
Majestic Travels Of OrcaMane & OGIE Album (2019)
The Love Was Never Hidden Album (2020)
OrcaMania 30,000 EP (2020)
Dirty Gospel Album (2020)

References 

Living people
African-American male rappers
Rappers from California
West Coast hip hop musicians
Underground rappers
1984 births
21st-century American rappers
21st-century American male musicians
21st-century African-American musicians
20th-century African-American people